Banks Rowing Club is based in Melbourne, Australia on the Yarra River. Banks Rowing Club was founded in 1866.

Presidents

Notable Members
Notable Members Include

Olympic Representatives 
Walter Howell
Paul Guest
Brian Vear
James Lowe
 Rosemary Popa

Non-Olympic Notable Members 
Leeanne Whitehouse

References

Sports clubs established in 1866
Rowing clubs in Australia
Sporting clubs in Melbourne
Boathouses
1866 establishments in Australia
History of rowing
Sport in the City of Melbourne (LGA)